The 2021 Acropolis International Tournament is a basketball tournament which will be held in OAKA Olympic Indoor Hall in Athens, Greece, from June 18. until June 20, 2021. It will be the 30th edition of the Acropolis International Basketball Tournament. The competition is played under FIBA rules as a round-robin tournament. The four participating teams will be Greece, Serbia, Mexico, and Puerto Rico.

Venues

Participating national teams

Standings

Results 
All times are local Eastern European Summer Time (UTC+3).

Final standing

See also 
 2020 Serbia men's OQT basketball team

References

External links
Hellenic Basketball Federation Official Website 
Basket.gr Acropolis Cup History Search Results 
Acropolis Cup 2021 Official Stat 
Acropolis Cup 

Acropolis International Basketball Tournament
Acropolis
2020–21 in Greek basketball
2020–21 in Serbian basketball